Geoffrey Beevers (born 15 January 1941) is a British actor who has appeared in many different stage and screen roles.

Career

Theatre
Beevers has worked extensively at the Orange Tree Theatre in Richmond upon Thames, both as an actor (including the title role in Jules Romain's Doctor Knock, 1994); and as an adaptor/director of George Eliot's novel Adam Bede (February 1990), for which he won a Time Out Award, and Honoré de Balzac's Père Goriot (February 1994).

In 2012, Beevers appeared as Fray Antonio in the Royal Shakespeare Company production of Helen Edmundson's The Heresy of Love. In March 2013 he played opposite Helen Mirren in Peter Morgan's play The Audience at the Gielgud Theatre, and reprised the role in February 2015 at the Gerald Schoenfeld Theatre in New York City.

From October 2016 to March 2017, he played Baron Gottfried Van Swieten in a production of Amadeus by Peter Shaffer at the Royal National Theatre's Olivier Stage.

Television
Beevers played the vicar in the film Goodnight Mister Tom, and appeared in the 1978 television film The Nativity. In 1986 he played Major Hetman Jack Parham in a BBC TV adaption of Parham's 1936 book, "Flying For Fun". In 1988 he appeared in the TV movie sequel The Great Escape II: The Untold Story, and played Wainwright (Member of Parliament) in A Very British Coup for Channel 4 Television (UK). He played several roles in the TV drama Agatha Christie's Poirot, and a small role in the 2010 remake of Clash of the Titans as a noble of Basilica. In February 2010 Beevers played Douglas Hogg in the television film On Expenses.

Doctor Who
Beevers has made two appearances in the BBC science fiction series Doctor Who, including playing the Master in the serial The Keeper of Traken, a role he has since reprised in some of Big Finish Productions' Doctor Who audio dramas (Dust Breeding, Master, Trail of the White Worm, The Oseidon Adventure, Mastermind, And You Will Obey Me, The Two Masters, The Light at the End, The Evil One, Requiem for the Rocket Men, Death Match and Masterful). Beevers narrated the unabridged audio edition of Doctor Who: Harvest of Time, by Alastair Reynolds, released in June 2013. He also read the AudioGO (and later Audible) audiobooks of Doctor Who and the Terror of the Autons, Doctor Who and the Doomsday Weapon, Doctor Who and the Sea Devils, Doctor Who and the Space War, Doctor Who and the Deadly Assassin, Doctor Who and the State of Decay, and The Ambassadors of Death.

Personal life
Beevers was married to actress Caroline John, who appeared in Doctor Who as Liz Shaw, from June 1970 until her death on 5 June 2012. They had three children: daughter Daisy and sons Ben and Tom.

References

External links
 
 Univ.of Texas' Shakespeare Studies - Brief Biography with a comprehensive list of television, film, and theatre roles

Living people
British male stage actors
British male television actors
British theatre directors
1941 births